Provo Central station is an intermodal transit station in Provo, Utah, United States. It is served by the Utah Transit Authority's (UTA) FrontRunner commuter rail line as well as local, intra-county, and interstate buses. It is the southern terminus of the commuter rail system, with service running north as far as Ogden. The station is also known as Provo Intermodal Hub, Provo Station, or Provo CRS. It is part of the FrontRunner South extension.

Description 

The station is at 690 South University Avenue U.S. Route 189 on 15 acres and covers a two city block area between Freedom Boulevard (200 West) and University Avenue. It is accessed from I-15 by way of either the University Avenue or Provo Center Street (SR 114) interchanges.

The station has a Park and Ride lot with over 800 free parking spaces available. The station is one block east of the Provo Amtrak station, which is a stop for the California Zephyr. While there are several retail business (including fast food restaurants) just south of the station, it is within walking distance of downtown Provo. The station is within the Quiet Zone, so all trains (including Amtrak's and Union Pacific's) do not routinely sound their horns when approaching public crossings within this corridor. The station opened, along with the rest of FrontRunner South, on December 10, 2012 and is operated by Utah Transit Authority.

The Provo FrontRunner Station is the main part of the Provo Intermodal Center. UTA refers to it as an intermodal center because of the UVX BRT transfer station just south of the rail platform. UVX connects the station with Orem Central station by way of BYU and UVU.

Future 

Having completed Phase One of the Provo Intermodal Center which includes the FrontRunner station, the local and intra-county bus stops, and the Park and Ride lot, UTA completed Phase Two in 2018 and anticipates to have Phase Three complete a few years after that. Phase Two will include accommodations for UVX as well as a parking structure (to be built on the northeast corner of the Park and Ride lot and adjacent to the University Avenue viaduct). Phase Three is anticipated to include mixed-use, transit oriented development (TOD). However, unlike the TOD at other stations (such as Station Park at the Farmington station), UTA plans to include these facilities within the confines of the intermodal center, rather than just close by.

References 

Railway stations in the United States opened in 2012
UTA FrontRunner stations
Buildings and structures in Provo, Utah
Transportation in Utah County, Utah
2012 establishments in Utah
Railway stations in Utah County, Utah